The Star class at the 2011 ISAF Sailing World Championships was held in Perth, Western Australia between 11 and 17 December 2011.

Results

References

External links

Star
Star World Championships